Foreign relations exist between the Republic of Azerbaijan and the Kingdom of Spain. Both nations are members of the Council of Europe.

History 

Spain has had diplomatic relations with the Republic of Azerbaijan since February 11, 1992, shortly after its independence after the breakup of the Soviet Union.

On July 8, 1997 the President Heydar Aliyev and Foreign Minister Hasan Hasanov attended a NATO summit held in Madrid.

In 2003, foreign trade between Spain and Azerbaijan totaled $US 264.3 million during January–June 2003. $241.3 million was from the exportation from Azerbaijan to Spain of crude oil. $23 million worth of goods and services were imported from Spain. The Spanish company Repsoil is involved in oil exploration in Azerbaijan.

In the end of 2005, Azerbaijan opened an embassy in Madrid.

As of 2005, there were two pending bilateral agreements between Azerbaijan awaiting signature : the Bilateral Agreement on the Promotion and Reciprocal Protection of Investments and the Convention on the Avoidance of Double Taxation.

In 2006 Spanish diplomats met in Baku with representatives of the President's Office, Foreign Ministry, and meet opposition leaders. The delegation also met ambassadors of OSCE member states that are accredited in Baku.

See also
 Foreign relations of Azerbaijan
 Foreign relations of Spain

References

 

 
Spain
Azerbaijan